Ghulam Murtaza (born 15 December 1990 in Azad Kashmir), is a Pakistani cricketer.

Domestic career
Murtaza made his debut for AJK Jaguars against the Islamabad Leopards in the 2014–15 National T20 Cup. Murtaza scored 11 (8). Islamabad won the match by 34 runs. Murtaza played his next match against the Faisalabad Wolves. He scored 24* (15). Faisalabad won by 8 wickets. Murtaza played his next match against the Peshawar Panthers. He scored 2 (7). Peshawar won the match by 9 wickets. Murtaza played his last match of the tournament against the Lahore Eagles. He scored 1 (4). Lahore won by 7 wickets.

References

External links
 
 Ghulam Murtaza at Pakistan Cricket Board

1990 births
Living people
Pakistani cricketers
People from Azad Kashmir